Perrott's Folly, also known as The Monument, or The Observatory, is a 29-metre (96-foot) tall tower, built in 1758. It is a Grade II* listed building in the Edgbaston area of Birmingham, United Kingdom.

History
Built in the open Rotton Park by John Perrott in 1758, who lived in Belbroughton, the tower now stands high above the local residential and business housing.

There are many stories to explain why the tower was built. One is that John Perrott wanted to be able to survey his land and perhaps entertain guests. Or the tower might have been used to spot animals for hunting.

From 1884 to 1979 the tower was used as a weather recording station for the Birmingham and Midland Institute. In 1966 the Geography Department of the University of Birmingham took over the running of the observatory until operations were transferred to the main campus.

It has been suggested,  but not proven, that the towers of Perrott's Folly and Edgbaston Waterworks may have influenced references to towers in the writings of J. R. R. Tolkien, who lived nearby as a child.

Prospects
The Perrott's Folly Company was formed in 1984 to renovate the tower and make it accessible to the public. The company obtained grants from English Heritage and Birmingham City Council to secure the building.

In the summer of 2005 the Perrott's Folly Company, in partnership with Birmingham Conservation Trust, completed work to stabilise the structure. However, money still has to be found to complete repairs to some of the key features. In April 2008 the tower was temporarily opened to the public, housing an art exhibition in co-operation with the Ikon Gallery. It was opened again in May 2008 as part of a weekend of celebrations of the life of J. R. R. Tolkien. The Perrott's Folly Company was formally closed in August 2009. The tower was managed by Trident Housing Association between 2005 and 2017 and is now managed by Re.Future Collective, a Birmingham based Arts and Architecture Collective.

References

Sources
 A Guide to the Buildings of Birmingham, Peter Leather,

External links
 https://web.archive.org/web/20180109181043/http://www.follyproject.org/

Folly towers in England
Buildings and structures in Birmingham, West Midlands
Grade II* listed buildings in the West Midlands (county)
J. R. R. Tolkien
Edgbaston
Towers in the West Midlands (county)
Towers completed in 1758